HMS R4 was one of 10 R-class submarine built for the Royal Navy during the First World War. The boat was not completed before the end of the war and was sold for scrap in 1934.

Design and description
The R-class submarine was designed to meet an Admiralty requirement for a specialised hunter-killer submarine with an emphasis on submerged performance. They displaced  on the surface and  submerged. The R-class submarines had a crew of 2 officers and 20 ratings.

For surface running, the boats were powered by a single eight-cylinder   diesel engine that drove the single propeller shaft. When submerged it was driven by a  electric motor. They could reach  on the surface and  underwater.

The boats were armed with six 18-inch (45 cm) torpedo tubes in the bow. They carried six reload torpedoes for a grand total of a dozen torpedoes. They were equipped with an array of five hydrophones in the bow to allow them to locate and engage targets while submerged.

Construction and career
HMS R4 was laid down on 4 March 1917 at Chatham Dockyard, launched on 8 June 1918 and commissioned on 23 August 1919. She came too late to see any combat in World War I, like most of the other R-class submarines. Her shape resulted in her being nicknamed "The Slug".

On 1 November 1926, R4 ran aground at Exmouth, Devon, England. She was refloated 10½ hours later.

R4 was the only boat to survive through to the 1930s. Additions to her casing produced slightly better sea keeping at the cost of a reduced speed from 15 knots submerged to 13 knots. She was used as a fast underwater target at the Portland anti-submarine school until 1934, then sold on 26 May 1934 to Young, Sunderland.

Notes

References
 
 
 
 

 

British R-class submarines
Royal Navy ship names
1918 ships
Maritime incidents in 1926